Jalan Sungai Pak Leh (Pahang state route C100) is a major road in Pahang, Malaysia.

List of junctions

Roads in Pahang